You Better Believe may refer to:

"You Better Believe", song by Gene Vincent from Gene Vincent and His Blue Caps 1957, covered by Jeff Beck on Crazy Legs 1993
"You Better Believe", song by Train from A Girl, a Bottle, a Boat 2017

See also
You Better Believe It
You Better Believe It!
You Better Believe Me